The 1974–75 Liga Bet season saw Hapoel Tel Hanan, Hapoel Mahane Yehuda, Maccabi HaShikma Ramat Gan and Beitar Ashdod win their regional divisions and promoted to Liga Alef.

North Division A

North Division B

South Division A

South Division B

References
Liga Bet tables Davar, 19.5.75, Historical Jewish Press 

Liga Bet seasons
Israel
3